Bawal Na Gamot is a 1994 Philippine action crime film directed by Francis "Jun" Posadas and written by Ricardo Lee. The film stars Romnick Sarmenta. The film is named after the hit song of Willy Garte and promotes the anti-drug campaign under Fidel Ramos.

Cast
Main cast
Romnick Sarmenta as Lester
Aiko Melendez as Shiela
Gardo Versoza as Jimbo
Boots Anson-Roa as Lester's mother
Dante Rivero as Lester's father
Jess Lapid Jr.
Jeffrey Santos
Michael Locsin
Mikee Villanueva as Leni
Dick Israel as Tom
Don Umali
Ruben Rustia
Mon Confiado
Fred Moro
Evelyn Vargas
Beverly Salviejo
Jimmy Reyes

Guest cast
Ernesto Herrera as himself
Tito Sotto as himself
Juan Rodrigo as Tony
Perla Bautista
Lito Legaspi
Willy Garte as himself
Romeo Asuncion as himself

References

External links

1994 films
Filipino-language films
Films about drugs
Philippine action films
Seiko Films films
1994 action films
Films directed by Francis Posadas